Anomalipes zhaoi (meaning "Zhao Xijin's unusual foot") is an extinct caenagnathid dinosaur discovered in China. It lived during the Campanian-aged (Late Cretaceous period) Wangshi Group in China. It is the only species in the genus Anomalipes.

Discovery
The remains of Anomalipes were discovered within a Shantungosaurus bonebed at the Kugou locality.
The holotype (ZCDM V0020, housed at Zhucheng Dinosaur Museum, Zhucheng, Shandong) is an incomplete left hind-limb, including a partial left thigh, shin and shank, a complete metatarsal III and two toe bones.

Etymology
Anomalipes is derived from the Latin anomalus (peculiar, abnormal, not easily classified) and pes (foot), referring to the unusual shape of its foot. The species epithet, zhaoi, was named in honour of Zhao Xijin.

See also
2018 in archosaur paleontology
 Timeline of oviraptorosaur research

References

Fossil taxa described in 2018
Dinosaurs of Asia
Caenagnathids